The sixth season of The Celebrity Apprentice Australia premiered on the Nine Network on 22 May 2022. British business magnate and The Apprentice UK host, Lord Alan Sugar leads the series as CEO, with Janine Allis returning as a boardroom advisor and Nick Bell as new advisor.

Production

In September 2021, the series was renewed for a sixth season with Lord Alan Sugar returning as CEO, and revealing Turia Pitt and Will & Woody as some of the competing celebrities. On 17 October 2021, Nine announced the full list of celebrities competing in the season.

Candidates

Beck was originally fired in task 1, but was brought back into the competition during task 5.
Eloni was originally fired in task 2, but was brought back into the competition during task 5.

Episode results

 The candidate won the competition and was named the Celebrity Apprentice.
 The candidate won as project manager on his/her team.
 The candidate lost as project manager on his/her team.
 The candidate was on the losing team.
 The candidate was brought to the final boardroom.
 The candidate was fired.
 The candidate lost as project manager and was fired.
 The candidate won their place back in the competition in a Redemption task.
 The candidate did not participate in the task.

Tasks

Task 1

Airdate: 22 May 2022

Task 2

Airdate: 23 May 2022

Task 3

Airdate: 24 May 2022

Task 4

Airdate: 25 May 2022

Task 5

Airdate: 29 May 2022

Task 6

Airdate: 30 May 2022

Task 7

Airdate: 31 May 2022

Task 8

Airdate: 1 Jun 2022

Task 9

Airdate: 5 Jun 2022

Task 10

Airdate: 6 Jun 2022

Task 11

Airdate: 7 Jun 2022

Task 12

Airdate: 13 Jun 2022

Task 13

Airdate: 14 Jun 2022

Task 14

Airdate: 15 Jun 2022

Task 15

Airdate: 20 Jun 2022

Task 16

Airdate: 21 Jun 2022

Ratings

References

Australia 6
2022 Australian television seasons
Television shows filmed in Australia